Vaillante is a fictional French company of which most of the activity is related to automobile. Vaillante is featured in the French comic book series Michel Vaillant. Vaillante was founded by Henri Vaillant.

Fictional subsidiaries

Vaillante was in the beginning a French transporting company. They also created their own trucks and cars, and decided to enter the Formula One, with Michel Vaillant, the son of Henri, as their pilot. The chief designer of Vaillante is Jean-Pierre, the elder brother of Michel Vaillant. The Vaillante logo is very similar to that of actual French auto maker Matra.

Les Usines Vaillante is the France-based and automobile manufacturer created by Henri Vaillant and specialized in trucks and high performance sports cars . Vaillante factories are made up of many training circuits, parking, various buildings for stockage and many offices.

Vaillante Team is the name of the motorsport brand which belongs to the Vaillante firm. According to Michel Vaillant albums, Henri Vaillant created it in 1939, when he engaged his own car in the Mans 24 hours race. His teammate was Miss Margareth Ranson, an English female driver. Then Jean-Pierre Vaillant, Henri's son, took over as leader of the team. Some prestigious drivers were employed by the Vaillant team, among them the main characters of the Michel Vaillant series, Michel Vaillant, Jean-Pierre Vaillant, Steve Warson, Yves Douléac, Julie Wood, Gabrielle Spangenberg, but also many non-fictional drivers such as Vanina Ickx, Jacky Ickx, Didier Pironi, Patrick Tambay, Thierry Boutsen, Jean-Pierre Beltoise, René Arnoux and Éric Bernard.

A.S.V (Amicale Sportive Vaillant) is the name of the association related to Vaillante. The association have at its disposal a centre of formation and learning for young pilots.

Benjamin Vaillant is the name of an independent transporting company established in Marseille, run by Benjamin Vaillant, Henri Vaillant's brother, with the collaboration Mme. Douléac, Yves Douléac's mother.

Non-fictional existence
 Vaillante has a large following in France and Belgium, and there are many toy models of Vaillante cars available for fans, based on the series.
 In 1997, a Courage C41 was painted in a Vaillante color scheme and entered in the 1997 24 Hours of Le Mans, in which it finished fourth. 
 In 2002, a Lola B98/10 LMP sportscar in Vaillante livery was entered at the 2002 24 Hours of Le Mans to obtain footage for the Luc Besson film Michel Vaillant.
 There have been also a few attempts to create real Vaillante cars, both road cars and racing cars. A driving school project was launched and the FR2000 Vaillante team was created by Graton Editeur and SportsManShip. 
 In 2006, a prototype blue SEAT Ibiza Vaillante designed by Luc Donckerwolke is presented in Geneva.
 A Vaillante themed Chevrolet Cruze 1.6T driven by Alain Menu appeared on round 7 of the 2012' FIA World Touring Car Championship held at the Autódromo Internacional do Algarve between 1–3 June 2012.
 Several Vaillante Grand Défi cars were created in 2011.
 In 2017, Rebellion Racing entered the 2017 FIA World Endurance Championship under the name Vaillante Rebellion, and their Oreca 07 LMP2 cars sported a Vaillanted livery.

Main fictional models
Vaillante Cairo
Vaillante Commando
Vaillante F1
Vaillante Grand Défi
Vaillante GT3
Vaillante Marathon
Vaillante Rush
Vaillante Ouragan
Vaillante Le Mans
 "Vaillante Mystere"
 "Vaillante Francoise"
 "Vaillante Panamericana"
 "Vaillante Sport"
 "Vaillante Sport-Proto" 
 "Vaillante Speciale Indianapolis"

References

External links
Fan club
Bienvenue aux Usines Vaillante
SEAT press release about the Ibiza Vaillante
 A Vaillante signed Donckerowlke

Fictional companies
Fictional organizations in comics
Michel Vaillant